Basatin (also Romanized as Basātīn; also known as Basītīn, Beseytīn, Besītayn, and Busaithin) is a village in Jarahi Rural District, in the Central District of Mahshahr County, Khuzestan Province, Iran. At the 2006 census, its population was 297, in 51 families.

References 

Populated places in Mahshahr County